The qualification competition for the 2012 FIFA Futsal World Cup was a series of tournaments organised by the six FIFA confederations.

Qualified teams

Africa (CAF)

|}

Morocco, Egypt & Libya qualified.

Europe (UEFA)

|}

Spain, Russia, Italy, Portugal, Czech Republic, Ukraine & Serbia qualified.

Asia (AFC)

Japan, Iran, Australia & Kuwait qualified.

North America, Central America and Caribbean (CONCACAF)

Group A

Group B

Guatemala, Panama, Mexico & Costa Rica qualified.

Oceania (OFC)

Final 

Solomon Islands qualified.

South America (CONMEBOL)

Group A

Group B 

Brazil, Argentina, Colombia & Paraguay qualified.

External links
 FIFA Futsal World Cup at FIFA.com
 FIFA Futsal World Cup at UEFA.com

 

Qualification, 2012 Fifa Futsal World Cup
2012